Park Ji-won (born 23 September 1996) is a South Korean short track speed skater.

He participated at the 2019 World Short Track Speed Skating Championships, winning a medal.

References

External links

1996 births
Living people
Competitors at the 2017 Winter Universiade
Competitors at the 2019 Winter Universiade
Four Continents Short Track Speed Skating Championships medalists
People from Gangneung
South Korean male short track speed skaters
Sportspeople from Gangwon Province, South Korea
World Short Track Speed Skating Championships medalists
Universiade gold medalists for South Korea
Universiade silver medalists for South Korea
Universiade bronze medalists for South Korea
Universiade medalists in short track speed skating
21st-century South Korean people